Lincoln Village is a census-designated place (CDP) in Prairie Township, Franklin County, Ohio, United States. It is centered near the intersection of US 40 and I-270 on the west side of Columbus. As of the 2010 census, the population was 9,032, down from 9,482 at the 2000 census.

Lincoln Village was started in 1955 as a planned community by a real estate subsidiary of Nationwide Insurance. The community was developed to have all the essentials, such as a shopping center, schools, and parks, and to incorporate safety considerations such as not positioning the homes on street corners to eliminate blind intersections.

History
Ohio Farm Bureau Federation President and CEO Murray Lincoln had aspired to create a suburban "village" since the early 1940s. Lincoln, as the head of what would become Nationwide Insurance from 1920 to 1948, initiated work on the Lincoln Village project in the early 1950s with the support of the U.S. Cooperative Movement. Lincoln was able to "sell" the Cooperative ideology to Ohio individual farmers, and viewed co-ops as "an answer to Communism in Europe and Asia, and as a balance wheel against unfettered private enterprise in the U.S." After founding several co-op and non co-op enterprises, Lincoln was able to fund the development of Lincoln Village with assets made from these corporations (which totaled $133,510,000). Lincoln's People's Development Corporation was formed to build Lincoln Village. The price of this project was about $30,000,000 USD. The plan for Lincoln Village included  of streets, sewers, a pumping station, and a million-gallon water pump. Lincoln Village was built for 10,000 inhabitants, and was set around a  civic center. A shopping center would also be built. Housing in the village was to include apartment buildings and single family homes priced between $9,000 to $16,000.

Geography
Lincoln Village is located in west-central Franklin County at  (39.952696, -83.132598).

The Pennsylvania Railroad borders Lincoln Village to the north, Sullivant Avenue to the south, and Interstate 270 to the east. The western border of Lincoln Village follows Hilliard Rome Road and Norton Road, the larger northwest portion by Hilliard-Rome Road and the smaller southwest portion by Norton Road. U.S. Route 40 (the National Road, known as W. Broad Street within the community) runs through the center of town, leading east  to the center of Columbus. The city of Columbus borders Lincoln Village to the north, west, and south; a portion of Franklin Township is to the east, across I-270.

Adjacent neighborhoods include New Rome, Rome Heights, Cherry Creek, and National Pike Little Farms.

Demographics

As of the census of 2010, there were 9,032 people, 3,734 households, and 2,265 families residing in the CDP. The racial makeup is 82.1% White, 6.3% Black or African American, 0.4% Native American, 0.9% Asian, 0% Pacific Islander, 7.3% from other races, and 3% from two or more races. Hispanic or Latino people of any race were 10.7% of the population.

There were 3,734 households, out of which 24.3% had children under the age of 18 living with them, 37.9% were married couples living together, 15.8% had a female householder with no husband present, and 39.3% were non-families. 31.8% of all households were made up of individuals living alone, and 12.9% had someone living alone who was 65 years of age or older. The average household size was 2.42 and the average family size was 3.04.

The population was spread out, with 23.6% under the age of 18, 8.3% from 18 to 24, 26.7% from 25 to 44, 26.9% from 45 to 64, and 14.5% who were 65 years of age or older. The median age was 38.2 years. For every 100 females, there were 96.8 males. For every 100 females age 18 and over, there were 93.8 males.

The median income for a household in the CDP was $41,250, and the median income for a family was $49,199. Male, full-time, year-round workers had a median income of $31,804 versus $30,807 for females. The per capita income is $19,180. About 12.8% of families and 15.8% of the population were below the poverty line, including 24.0% of those under age 18 and 5.6% of those age 65 or over.

Economy

Lincoln Village Plaza is a major shopping center on West Broad Street in Lincoln Village. Major tenants include Giant Eagle, Joann Fabrics, and the Westland Area Library.

Education

Lincoln Village is part of the South-Western City School District. As of the 2010 Census, 75.8% of the residents of Lincoln Village age 25 and over were high school graduates or higher.

See also
West Columbus, Ohio

References

External links
 Lincoln Village, Ohio at About.com

Populated places established in 1955
Census-designated places in Franklin County, Ohio
Planned cities in the United States
1955 establishments in Ohio